Casau is a locality and decentralized municipal entity located in the municipality of Vielha e Mijaran, in Province of Lleida province, Catalonia, Spain. As of 2020, it has a population of 68.

Geography 
Casau is located 160km north of Lleida.

References

Populated places in the Province of Lleida